Boggo Road railway station is a railway station currently under construction as part of the Cross River Rail project in the Brisbane suburb of Dutton Park in Queensland, Australia.  It is planned for a health, science and knowledge cluster and mixed-use precinct to develop around the station. It is expected to provide facilities to 23,000 people each weekday, making it the second busiest station in the state.

To be built as an underground station, it will consist of two platforms with connections to Park Road station and  Boggo Road busway station. Construction commenced in September 2019, with it scheduled to open in 2024.  The platforms are positioned 19 metres below ground. 

The station will provide pedestrian access between the Princess Alexandra Hospital and the Boggo Road Precinct, currently separated by road and rail infrastructure. This will be provided via a 480-metre-long pedestrian and cycle bridge.

Construction
Because of the fractured ground conditions the station was constructed using a combination of open box and cavern construction.  Roadheaders excavating the tunnel from Woolloongabba railway station reached the cavern in September 2021.  17,000 tonnes of concrete and 16,000 tonnes of steel were used during construction.

References

Dutton Park, Queensland
Proposed railway stations in Australia

Railway stations located underground in Australia
Railway stations scheduled to open in 2024